This is a list of terrorist incidents in Lahore since 2000.

Incidents by year

2004

2005

2006

2008

2009

2010

2011

2012

2013

2015

2016

2017

References